In Turkey, secularism or laicism (or laïcité) was first introduced with the 1928 amendment of the Constitution of 1924, which removed the provision declaring that the "Religion of the State is Islam", and with the later reforms of Turkey's first president Mustafa Kemal Atatürk, which set the administrative and political requirements to create a modern, democratic, secular state, aligned with Kemalism.

Nine years after its introduction, laïcité was explicitly stated in the second article of the then Turkish constitution on February 5, 1937. The current Constitution of 1982 neither recognizes an official religion nor promotes any.

The principles of Turkish secularism, and the separation of state and religion, were historically established in order to modernize the nation. This centralized progressive approach was seen as necessary not only for the operation of the Turkish government but also to avoid a cultural life dominated by superstition, dogma, and ignorance.

Turkey's concept of laiklik ("laicism") calls for the separation of state and religion, but also describes the state's stance as one of "active neutrality", which involves state control and legal regulation of religion. Turkey's actions related with religion are carefully analyzed and evaluated through the Presidency of Religious Affairs (Diyanet İşleri Başkanlığı or simply Diyanet). The duties of the Presidency of Religious Affairs are "to execute the works concerning the beliefs, worship, and ethics of Islam, enlighten the public about their religion, and administer the sacred worshipping places".

History

The history of secularism in Turkey extends to the Tanzimat reforms of Ottoman Empire. The second peak in secularism occurred during the Second Constitutional Era. The current form was achieved by Atatürk's Reforms.

Ottoman Empire

The establishing structure (Ruling institution of the Ottoman Empire) of the Ottoman Empire (13th century) was an Islamic state in which the head of the Ottoman state was the Sultan. The social system was organized around millet. Millet structure allowed a great degree of religious, cultural and ethnic continuity to non-Muslim populations across the subdivisions of the Ottoman Empire and at the same time it permitted their incorporation into the Ottoman administrative, economic and political system. The Ottoman-appointed governor collected taxes and provided security, while the local religious or cultural matters were left to the regional communities to decide. On the other hand, the sultans were Muslims and the laws that bound them were based on the Sharia, the body of Islamic law, as well as various cultural customs. The Sultan, beginning in 1517, was also a caliph, the leader of all the Sunni Muslims in the world. By the turn of the 19th century the Ottoman ruling elite recognized the need to restructure the legislative, military and judiciary systems to cope with their new political rivals in Europe. When the millet system started to lose its efficiency due to the rise of nationalism within its borders, the Ottoman Empire explored new ways of governing its territory composed of diverse populations.

Sultan Selim III founded the first secular military schools by establishing the new military unit, Nizam-ı Cedid, as early as 1792. However the last century (19th century) of the Ottoman Empire had many far reaching reforms. These reforms peaked with the Tanzimat which was the initial reform era of the Ottoman Empire. After the Tanzimat, rules, such as those relating to the equalized status of non-Muslim citizens, the establishment of a parliament, the abandonment of medieval punishments for apostasy, as well as the codification of the constitution of the empire and the rights of Ottoman subjects were established. The First World War brought about the fall of the Ottoman Empire and the subsequent partitioning of the Ottoman Empire by the victorious Allies.

Reforms of Republic

Reforms and policies designed to modernize Turkey adopted by Kemal Atatürk (1881-1938), the founder and the first president of Republic of Turkey, were known as "Kemalism", and had "six principles: republicanism, nationalism, populism, secularism, revolutionism and statism". Unlike some "softer" forms of secularism, Kemalist secularism "did not mean the separation of religion only from the state, rather it meant the separation of religion from whole public spheres—politics, jurisprudence, education, society and so on".

Kemalism excluded "religious symbols from public domain" and put religion "under the strict control of the  state".  
The weekly holiday was changed from Friday to Sunday, the calendar changed from the Muslim lunar to Gregorian, and the alphabet changed from Arabic to Latin.

During the establishment of the Republic, there were two sections of the elite group at the helm of the discussions for the future. These were the Islamist reformists and Westerners. They shared a similar goal, the modernization of the new state. Many basic goals were common to both groups. The founder of the modern Turkish Republic Mustafa Kemal Atatürk's achievement was to amplify this common ground and put the country on a fast track of reforms, now known as Atatürk's Reforms.

Their first act was to give the Turkish nation the right to exercise popular sovereignty via representative democracy. Prior to declaring the new Republic, the Turkish Grand National Assembly abolished the constitutional monarchy on November 1, 1922. The Turkish Grand National Assembly then moved to replace the extant Islamic law structure with the laws it had passed during the Turkish War of Independence, beginning in 1919. The modernization of the Law had already begun at the point that the project was undertaken in earnest. A milestone in this process was the passage of the Turkish Constitution of 1921. Upon the establishment of the Republic on October 29, 1923, the institution of the caliphate remained, but the passage of a new constitution in 1924 effectively abolished this title held by the Ottoman Sultanate since 1517. Even as the new constitution eliminated the caliphate it, at the same time, declared Islam as the official religion of the Turkish Republic. According to the law text passed by the Turkish Parliament, "Since the Caliphate was essentially present in the meaning and concept of the Government and the Republic, the office of the Caliphate was abolished."

Following quickly upon these developments, a number of social reforms were undertaken. Many of these reforms affected every aspect of Turkish life, moving to erase the legacy of dominance long held by religion and tradition. The unification of education, installation of a secular education system, and the closure of many religious orders took place on March 3, 1924. This extended to closure of religious convents and dervish lodges on November 30, 1925. These reforms also included the extension to women of voting rights in 1931 and the right be to elected to public office on December 5, 1934. The inclusion of reference to laïcité into the constitution was achieved by an amendment on February 5, 1937, a move regarded as the final act in the project of instituting complete separation between governmental and religious affairs in Turkey.

Erdoğan's policies of Islamization

According to at least one observer (Mustafa Akyol), under the Islamic Justice and Development Party (AKP) government of Recep Tayyip Erdoğan, "hundreds of secularist officers and their civilian allies" were jailed starting in 2007, and by 2012 the "old secularist guard" were removed from positions of authority and replaced by members/supporters of the AKP and the Islamic Gülen movement. On 25 April 2016, the Turkish Parliament Speaker İsmail Kahraman told a conference of Islamic scholars and writers in Istanbul that "secularism would not have a place in a new constitution”, as Turkey is “a Muslim country and so we should have a religious constitution". (One of the duties of Parliament Speaker is to pen a new draft constitution for Turkey.)

Traditionally the function of the Diyanet was to maintain control over and limit the religious sphere of Islam in Turkey. Some (David Lepeska, Svante Cornell) have complained that under Erdoğan that role has "largely been turned on its head", with the Diyanet (now greatly increased in size), promoting Islam in Turkey, specifically a certain type of conservative (Hanafi Sunni) Islam—issuing fatawa forbidding such activities as "feeding dogs at home, celebrating the western New Year, lotteries, and tattoos"; and projecting this "Turkish Islam" abroad.

In education, the Erdoğan AKP government has pursued the explicit policy agenda of Islamization to "raise a devout generation" against secular resistance, in the process causing many non-religious citizens of Turkey to lose their jobs and schooling. 
Following the July 2016 coup attempt—which President Erdoğan called “a gift from God"—thousands were purged by the Justice and Development Party (AKP) government. The victims were primarily followers of the Gülen movement — which is alleged to have launched the coup—but also secularists who had not already been sacked in earlier purges. One explanation for the replacement of secularist policies in Turkey is that business interests who felt threatened by socialism saw Islamic values as "best suited to neutralize any challenges from the left to capitalist supremacy."

Pushback against AKP conservative Hanafi Sunni Islamization 
Some (such as Turan Kayaoğlu) see interest and support of secularism in Turkey as strengthening, not decreasing. After Erdogan made the statement about his desire to "raise a religious youth," politicians of all parties condemned his statements as abandoning Turkish values. A petition reading "[O]f Muslim, Christian, Jewish, Zoroastrian, Alawite, Shafi’i, religious and nonreligious, atheist and agnostic backgrounds, all joined with a firm belief in secularism, [we] find your recent remarks about raising a religious and conservative youth most alarming and dangerous" was signed by over 2,000 people. The pro-government newspaper Bugün ran a story stating "no one has the right to convert this society into a religious one, or the opposite." Surveys of the Turkish people also show a great support for maintaining a secular country. The Turkish Economic and Social Studies Foundation found that only 9% of Turks supported a religious state in 2006. A more recent 2015 poll by Metropoll found that over 80% of Turkish people supported the continuation of Turkey as a secular state, with even the majority of AKP voters supporting a secular state too.

Constitutional principles

The Constitution asserts that Turkey is supposed to be a secular and democratic republic, deriving its sovereignty from the people. The sovereignty rests with the Turkish Nation, who delegates its exercise to an elected unicameral parliament, the Turkish Grand National Assembly. Moreover, Article 4: declares the immovability the founding principles of the Republic defined in the first three Articles:
"secularism, social equality, equality before the law"
"the Republican form of government"
"the indivisibility of the Republic and of the Turkish Nation",
The Constitution bans any proposals for the modification of these articles. Each of these concepts which were distributed in the three articles of the constitution can not be achieved without the other two concepts.
The constitution requires a central administration which would lose its meaning (effectiveness, coverage, etc.) if the system is not based on laïcité, social equality, and equality before law. Vice versa, if the Republic differentiate itself based on social, religious differences, administration can not be equal to the population when the administration is central. The system which tried to be established in the constitution sets out to found a unitary nation-state based on the principles of secular democracy.

Impact on society

The Turkish Constitution recognizes freedom of religion for individuals whereas identified religious communities are placed under the protection of state. The constitution explicitly states that it is illegal for a religious community to get involved in politics, or to form a Party openly representing a religious group.

In recent history, two parties have been ordered to close (Welfare Party in 1998, and Virtue Party in 2001) by the Constitutional Court for Islamist activities and attempts to "redefine the secular nature of the republic". The first party to be closed for suspected anti-secularist activities was the Progressive Republican Party on June 3, 1925.

Issues relating to Turkey's secularism were discussed in the lead up to the 2007 presidential elections, in which the ruling party chose a candidate with Islamic connections, Abdullah Gül, for the first time in its secular republic. While some in Turkey have expressed concern that the nomination could represent a move away from Turkey's secularist traditions, including particularly Turkey's priority on equality between the sexes, others have suggested that the conservative party has effectively promoted modernization while reaching out to more traditional and religious elements in Turkish society. On July 22, 2007 it was reported that the more religiously conservative ruling party won a larger than expected electoral victory in the parliamentary elections.

Turkey's preservation and maintenance of its secular identity has been a profound issue and source of tension. Prime Minister Recep Tayyip Erdoğan has broken with secular tradition, by speaking out in favor of limited Islamism and against the active restrictions, instituted by Atatürk on wearing the Islamic-style head scarves in government offices and schools. The Republic Protests were a series of peaceful mass rallies that took place in Turkey in the spring of 2007 in support of the Kemalist ideals of state secularism.

The constitutional rule that prohibits discrimination on religious grounds is taken very seriously. Turkey, as a secular country, prohibits by law the wearing of religious headcover and theo-political symbolic garments for both genders in government buildings and schools; a law upheld by the Grand Chamber of the European Court of Human Rights as legitimate on November 10, 2005 in Leyla Şahin v. Turkey.

The strict application of secularism in Turkey has been credited for enabling women to have access to greater opportunities, compared to countries with a greater influence of religion in public affairs, in matters of education, employment, wealth as well as political, social and cultural freedoms.

Also paradoxical with the Turkish secularism is the fact that identity document cards of Turkish citizens include the specification of the card holder's religion. This declaration was perceived by some as representing a form of the state's surveillance over its citizens' religious choices.

The mainstream Hanafite school of Sunni Islam is entirely organized by the state, through the Diyanet İşleri Başkanlığı (Religious Affairs Directorate), which supervises all mosques, educates the imams who work in them, and approves all content for religious services and prayers. It appoints imams, who are classified as civil servants. This micromanagement of Sunni religious practices, at times, seems much more sectarian than secular, as it violates the principle of state neutrality in religious practice. Groups that have expressed dissatisfaction with this situation include a variety of non-governmental Sunni / Hanafi groups (such as the Nurcu movement), whose interpretation of Islam tends to be more activist; and the non-Sunni (Alevi), whose members tend to resent supporting the Sunni establishment with their tax money (whereas the Turkish state does not subsidize Alevi religious activities).

Criticism
Atatürk's ideology of Kemalism abolished the Ottoman caliphate, removed Islam as the state religion, sharia from the legal code, and sought to banish religious interference in government affairs with the "Presidency of Religious Affairs" or Diyanet. However, a number of policies of the Turkish government are not in line with the concept of secularism.

Religion is mentioned on the Turkish identity documents. The government agency known as the "Presidency of Religious Affairs" or Diyanet draws on tax revenues collected from all Turkish citizens, but finances only Sunni worship. All other religions must ensure a financially self-sustaining running and they face administrative obstacles during operation.
For example, Câferî (Ja'fari) Muslims (mostly Azeris) and Alevi-Bektashi (mostly Turkmen) participate in the financing of the mosques and the salaries of Sunni imams, while their places of worship, which are not officially recognized by the State, do not receive any funding.

Theoretically, Turkey, through the Treaty of Lausanne (1923), recognizes the civil, political and cultural rights of non-Muslim minorities. In practice, Turkey only recognizes Greek, Armenian and Jewish religious minorities without granting them all the rights mentioned in the Treaty of Lausanne. Alevi-Bektashi or Câferî Muslims, Catholics and Protestants are not recognized officially.

With more than 100,000 employees, the Diyanet is a kind of state within the state.
In 2013, with over 4.6 billion TL (Turkish Lira), Diyanet or Ministry of Religious Affairs, occupies the 16th position of central government expenditure.

Headscarf controversy in Turkey 

With a policy of official secularism, the Turkish government has traditionally banned the wearing of headscarves by women who work in the public sector. The ban applies to teachers, lawyers, parliamentarians and others working on state premises. The ban on headscarves in the civil service and educational and political institutions was expanded to cover non-state institutions. Authorities began to enforce the headscarf ban among mothers accompanying their children to school events or public swimming pools, while female lawyers and journalists who refused to comply with the ban were expelled from public buildings such as courtrooms and universities . In 1999, the ban on headscarves in the public sphere hit the headlines when Merve Kavakçı, a newly elected MP for the Virtue Party was prevented from taking her oath in the National Assembly because she wore a headscarf. The constitutional rule that prohibits discrimination on religious grounds is taken very seriously. Turkey, as a secular country, prohibits by law the wearing of religious headcover and theo-political symbolic garments for both genders in government buildings, schools, and universities; a law upheld by the Grand Chamber of the European Court of Human Rights as legitimate on November 10, 2005 in Leyla Şahin v. Turkey.

Workplace 
According to Country Reports 2007, women who wore headscarves and their supporters "were disciplined or lost their jobs in the public sector" (US 11 March 2008, Sec. 2.c). Human Rights Watch (HRW) reports that in late 2005, the Administrative Supreme Court ruled that a teacher was not eligible for a promotion in her school because she wore a headscarf outside of work (Jan. 2007). An immigration counsellor at the Embassy of Canada in Ankara stated in 27 April 2005 correspondence with the Research Directorate that public servants are not permitted to wear a headscarf while on duty, but headscarved women may be employed in the private sector. In 12 April 2005 correspondence sent to the Research Directorate, a professor of political science specializing in women's issues in Turkey at Boğaziçi University in Istanbul indicated that women who wear a headscarf "could possibly be denied employment in private or government sectors." Conversely, some municipalities with a more traditional constituency might attempt to hire specifically those women who wear a headscarf (Professor 12 April 2005). The professor did add, however, that headscarved women generally experience difficulty in obtaining positions as teachers, judges, lawyers, or doctors in the public service (ibid.). More recent or corroborating information on the headscarf ban in the public service could not be found among the sources consulted by the Research Directorate.

The London-based Sunday Times reports that while the ban is officially in place only in the public sphere, many private firms similarly avoid hiring women who wear headscarves (6 May 2007). MERO notes that women who wear headscarves may have more difficulty finding a job or obtaining a desirable wage (Apr. 2008), although this could not be corroborated among the sources consulted by the Research Directorate.

Medical care 
According to the Sunday Times, headscarves are banned inside Turkish hospitals, and doctors may not don a headscarf on the job (6 May 2007). Nevertheless, MERO reports that under Turkey's current administration, seen by secularists to have a hidden religious agenda, doctors who wear headscarves have been employed in some public hospitals.

Ban lifted
On 9 February 2008, Turkey's parliament approved a constitutional amendment that lifted the ban on Islamic headscarves in universities. Prior to this date, the public ban on headscarves officially extended to students on university campuses throughout Turkey. Nevertheless, according to Country Reports on Human Rights Practices for 2007, "some faculty members permitted students to wear head coverings in class". Radio Free Europe/Radio Liberty notes that since the 1990s, some rectors have allowed students to wear headscarves.

On 5 June 2008, Turkey's Constitutional Court annulled the parliament's proposed amendment intended to lift the headscarf ban, ruling that removing the ban would run counter to official secularism. While the highest court's decision to uphold the headscarf ban cannot be appealed (AP 7 June 2008), the government has nevertheless indicated that it is considering adopting measures to weaken the court's authority.

Wearing of head-covering
According to a research by the Turkish Economic and Social Studies Foundation in 2007, around 62% of women wear the headscarf in Turkey.

Turkey's strong secularism has resulted in what have been perceived by some as strictures on the freedom of religion; for example, the headscarf has long been prohibited in public universities, and a constitutional amendment passed in February 2008 that permitted women to wear it on university campuses sparked considerable controversy. In addition, the armed forces have maintained a vigilant watch over Turkey's political secularism, which they affirm to be a keystone among Turkey's founding principles. The military has not left the maintenance of a secular political process to chance, however, and has intervened in politics on a number of occasions.

See also

 Freedom of religion in Turkey
 Headscarf controversy in Turkey
 Islam in Turkey
 Religion in Turkey
 White Turks

References

Further reading

Ahmet T. Kuru. Secularism and State Policies toward Religion The United States, France, and Turkey Cambridge University Press, 2009.
Peker, E. 2020. "Beyond Positivism: Building Turkish Laiklik in the Transition from the Empire to the Republic (1908–38)." Social Science History
Sevinc, K., Hood, R. W. Jr., Coleman, T. J. III, (2017). Secularism in Turkey. In Zuckerman, P., & Shook, J. R., (Eds.), The Oxford Handbook of Secularism. Oxford University Press.
M. Hakan Yavuz, "Understanding Turkish Secularism in the 21th Century: A Contextual Roadmap", Southeast European and Black Sea Studies, Vol. 19, No.1; https://doi.org/10.1080/14683857.2019.1576367

External links

 
Religion in Turkey
Secularism in the Middle East
Turkey
Religious policy